Fascaplysinopsis is a monotypic genus of sponges belonging to the family Thorectidae. The only species is Fascaplysinopsis reticulata.

The species is found in Indian and Pacific Ocean.

References

Thorectidae
Monotypic sponge genera